Atriplex parryi is a species of saltbush known by the common name Parry's saltbush. It is native to the deserts and plateaus of eastern California and western Nevada.

It is a plant of alkaline and saline soils in habitats such as salt flats, where it grows with other halophytes such as Nitrophila.

Description 
This is a small, stiff, spiny shrub growing to a maximum height near 50 centimeters. Its scaly, sharp-pointed stems tangle to give the plant a generally rounded form. It is covered densely in small gray-green oval-shaped leaves up to 2 centimeters long. The shrub is dioecious, with individuals producing either male or female flowers. Both flower types are borne in long clusters interspersed with leaves.

This species blooms from May to August.

External links
Jepson Manual Treatment
USDA Plants Profile
Flora of North America
Photo gallery

parryi
Halophytes
Flora of the California desert regions
Flora of Nevada
Flora of the Great Basin
Flora of the Sonoran Deserts
Natural history of the Colorado Desert
Natural history of the Mojave Desert
Plants described in 1882
Dioecious plants
Flora without expected TNC conservation status